Guaiazulene, also azulon or 1,4-dimethyl-7-isopropylazulene, is a dark blue crystalline hydrocarbon. A derivative of azulene, guaiazulene is a bicyclic sesquiterpene that is a constituent of some essential oils, mainly oil of guaiac and chamomile oil, which also serve as its commercial sources. Various soft corals also contain guaiazulene as a principal pigment. Its low melting point makes guaiazulene difficult to handle, in contrast to the crystalline nature of the parent azulene. The electronic structure (and colors) of guaiazulene and azulene are very similar.

A similar structure Alismol is in a different oxidation state.

Applications
Guaiazulene is an U.S. FDA-approved cosmetic color additive. It – or its 3-sulfonate – is a component of some skin care products together with other skin soothing compounds such as allantoin.

Guaiazulene has applications as a volatile dye with a known evaporation rate to indicate end of use of various products (such as insecticide strips).

Attempts to capitalize on the structure of Guaiazulene had led to Hns-32 [186086-10-2].

References

Cosmetics chemicals
Sesquiterpenes
Azulenes
Ophthalmology drugs